In sociocultural anthropology and archaeology, homology is a type of analogy whereby two human beliefs, practices, or artifacts are separated by time and/or place but share similarities due to some underlying factor, whether genetics, historical connection, psychological archetype, or otherwise. This type of homology is the counterpart of biologic homology in physical anthropology, whereby an anatomic structure is shared through descent from a common ancestor.

The concept was explored by the American archaeologist William Duncan Strong in his direct historical approach to archaeological theory. It is important in structural anthropology in particular but also in sociocultural anthropology in general.

See also 
Jungian archetypes

Anthropology